Dahira hoenei is a moth of the family Sphingidae. It was described by Rudolf Mell in 1937. It is known from Shaanxi and Sichuan in China.

References

Dahira
Moths described in 1937

vi:Dahira hoenei